Group A of UEFA Euro 2020 qualifying was split into ten groups of national teams. Group A was played between 22 March and 17 November 2019 and featured five teams with the top two teams qualifying for the UEFA Euro 2020 tournament. The group consisted of Bulgaria, Czech Republic, England, Kosovo and Montenegro. Teams played against each other home-and-away in a round-robin format.

England finished as group winners, with a single loss to the Czech Republic and seven wins, whilst the Czech Republic finished second with five wins and three losses. Both teams qualified directly for the main draw of UEFA Euro 2020. Unlike previous editions, the participants of the play-offs were not decided based on results from the qualifying group stage, but instead based on their performance in the 2018–19 UEFA Nations League. Due to the COVID-19 pandemic, the finals are to be played from 11 June to 11 July 2021, rather than in 2020.

Group summary
On 14 October 2019, during the Bulgaria v England match, there was racist behaviour from a group of Bulgarian fans. This included Nazi salutes, monkey chants and racist booing. The behaviour was widely condemned by the public and various groups, including the anti-racist football campaign Kick It Out. The next day, Prime Minister of Bulgaria Boyko Borisov called for Bulgarian Football Union president Borislav Mihaylov to resign following the racist incident. Mihaylov resigned a few hours later.

Standings

Matches
The fixtures were released by UEFA the same day as the draw, which was held on 2 December 2018 in Dublin. Times are CET/CEST, as listed by UEFA (local times, if different, are in parentheses).

Goalscorers

Discipline
A player was automatically suspended for the next match for the following offences:
 Receiving a red card (red card suspensions could be extended for serious offences)
 Receiving three yellow cards in three different matches, as well as after fifth and any subsequent yellow card (yellow card suspensions were not carried forward to the play-offs, the finals or any other future international matches)
The following suspensions were served during the qualifying matches:

Notes

References

External links
UEFA Euro 2020, UEFA.com
European Qualifiers, UEFA.com

Group A
2018–19 in Bulgarian football
2019–20 in Bulgarian football
2018–19 in Czech football
2019–20 in Czech football
Czech Republic at UEFA Euro 2020
2018–19 in English football
2019–20 in English football
England at UEFA Euro 2020
2018–19 in Kosovan football
2019–20 in Kosovan football
2018–19 in Montenegrin football
2019–20 in Montenegrin football